Heteropholis is a genus of African and Sri Lankan plants in the grass family.

 Species
 Heteropholis benoistii A.Camus - Madagascar
 Heteropholis nigrescens (Thwaites) C.E.Hubb. - Sri Lanka
 Heteropholis sulcata (Stapf) C.E.Hubb. - Zaḭre, Tanzania, Zambia, Angola, Malawi

 Formerly included
see Mnesithea 
 Heteropholis annua - Mnesithea annua 
 Heteropholis cochinchinensis - Mnesithea laevis var. cochinchinensis
 Heteropholis cochinchinensis var. chenii - Mnesithea laevis var. chenii

References

Andropogoneae
Poaceae genera
Grasses of Africa
Grasses of Asia
Taxa named by Charles Edward Hubbard